Arianna Garibotti (born 9 December 1989) is an Italian water polo player. She was part of the Italian team winning the bronze medal at the 2015 World Aquatics Championships, where she played in the centre back position.

See also
 List of Olympic medalists in water polo (women)
 List of World Aquatics Championships medalists in water polo

References

External links
 
 

1989 births
Living people
Water polo players from Genoa
Italian female water polo players
Water polo drivers
Water polo players at the 2016 Summer Olympics
Medalists at the 2016 Summer Olympics
Olympic silver medalists for Italy in water polo
World Aquatics Championships medalists in water polo
21st-century Italian women